In the United States, a department of public safety is a state or local government agency which often has a broad portfolio of responsibilities, which may include some or all of the following:

Fire services: provides fire prevention and suppression.
 Rescue services: provides rescue services.
 Haz-mat services: provides hazardous materials response.
 Ambulance 
 Policing services: provides law enforcement, community policing and outreach.
 Emergency communications: operates the public interface emergency communications telephone system by providing the 9-1-1 and Enhanced 911 emergency telephone numbers.
 Office of emergency management (OEM): plans for and operates the emergency operations center during calamities, disasters, special events and emergencies.
 Inspections and code enforcement: usually building safety, which includes construction, electrical et al. and vehicle inspections.
 Animal control: this category could also include wildlife officers, game wardens, and dog catchers.
 Department of motor vehicles (DMV): includes administration of driver's licenses, license plates and identification cards.
 Department of transportation (DOT): includes vehicle registration, tags and license plates.

These responsibilities are usually organized into separate agencies under a DPS due to their diversity, though there is a critical exception in certain local jurisdictions (as further explained below).

In other countries, equivalent agencies may be known as the ministry of the interior. In U.S. state or local governments that do not have a DPS, equivalent agencies may be known as the department of emergency services.

United States

Federal level

The United States Department of Homeland Security is the federal-level department of public safety of the United States, which is responsible for federal supervision of emergency services for major disasters through the Federal Emergency Management Agency (FEMA).

State and territorial level
In state governments in the United States, the DPS is often a law enforcement agency synonymous with the state police. At local and special district levels, they may be all-encompassing. Examples of states having these include Texas, Minnesota, Tennessee, Arizona, Alabama, Oklahoma, and South Carolina. In many states the state police may be a subdivision of the DPS and not its own independent department.

List of state and territorial departments of public safety
Alabama Department of Public Safety
Alaska Department of Public Safety
American Samoa Department of Public Safety
Arkansas Department of Public Safety
Arizona Department of Public Safety
Colorado Department of Public Safety
Connecticut Department of Public Safety
Delaware State Police
Florida Department of Law Enforcement
Georgia Department of Public Safety 
Hawaii Department of Public Safety
Iowa Department of Public Safety
Kentucky Justice and Public Safety Cabinet
Louisiana Department of Public Safety
Maine Department of Public Safety
Maryland Department of Public Safety and Correctional Services
Massachusetts Executive Office of Public Safety and Security
Minnesota Department of Public Safety
Missouri Department of Public Safety
Mississippi Department of Public Safety
New Jersey Department of Law and Public Safety
New Hampshire Department of Safety
New Mexico Department of Public Safety
Nevada Department of Public Safety 
North Carolina Department of Crime Control and Public Safety
North Dakota Department of Public Safety
Ohio Department of Public Safety
Oklahoma Department of Public Safety
Oregon Department of Public Safety Standards and Training
Puerto Rico Department of Public Safety
Rhode Island Department of Public Safety
South Carolina Department of Public Safety
South Dakota Department of Safety
Tennessee Department of Safety and Homeland Security
Texas Department of Public Safety
Utah Department of Public Safety
Vermont Department of Public Safety
Virginia Secretariat of Public Safety and Homeland Security
West Virginia Department of Military Affairs and Public Safety

Local level
Many local jurisdictions (cities and counties), and special districts (schools and hospitals) have the umbrella configuration described above, in which the DPS is simply a joint administration of several distinct agencies. They may share administrative support staff and back-office functions, but sworn personnel remain specialized and have particular responsibilities (that is, the police continue to arrest people and the firefighters put out fires). The DPS of Cobb County, Georgia is one example.

However, a minority of jurisdictions have departments of public safety which have primary and direct responsibility for all emergencies. In these unusual organizations, all full-time sworn personnel are cross-trained as police officers, firefighters and EMTs, and can respond to emergencies in any capacity. Although it is more expensive to hire, train and retain such personnel, they have a clear advantage in terms of their flexibility. They can respond as first responders to many rapidly evolving situations rather than waiting for the arrival of other specialized personnel.

This configuration was more widely popular in the 1970s and 1980s in the United States, but has since gone out of style because relatively few cities have been able to execute it successfully because of manpower limitations in handling major incidents.

In a few California cities (the San Gabriel Valley city of Duarte, for example), the department of public safety usually is restricted to code enforcement officers or animal control service agents (especially when those cities contract out for law enforcement with the county sheriff's office).

List of cities with departments of public safety with fully cross-trained personnel
Alaska
Hoonah Department of Public Safety
Ted Stevens Anchorage International Airport Department of Public Safety
Fairbanks International Airport Department of Public Safety
California
Rohnert Park Department of Public Safety
Sunnyvale Department of Public Safety
Florida
Daytona Beach Shores Department of Public Safety
Indian River Shores Public Safety Department
Jupiter Island Public Safety Department
Georgia
Bainbridge Department of Public Safety
Grovetown Department of Public Safety
Social Circle Department of Public Safety
Illinois
Glencoe Department of Public Safety
Rosemont Department of Public Safety
Indiana
Whitestown Department of Public Safety
Fort Wayne International Airport Department of Public Safety
Iowa
Cedar Falls Department of Public Safety
Nevada Department of Public Safety
Eastern Iowa Airport Department of Public Safety
Kansas
Augusta Department of Public Safety
Kentucky
Prestonsburg Department of Public Safety
Michigan
Albion Department of Public Safety
Berkley Department of Public Safety
Beverly Hills Department of Public Safety
Blackman Township Department of Public Safety
Bloomfield Hills Department of Public Safety
Capital Region Airport Authority Department of Public Safety
Centerline Department of Public Safety
Cheboygan Department of Public Safety
East Grand Rapids Department of Public Safety
Emmett Township Department of Public Safety
Escanaba Department of Public Safety
Essexville Department of Public Safety
Farmington Department of Public Safety
Flint Bishop Airport Authority Department of Public Safety
Fraser Department of Public Safety
Gladstone Department of Public Safety
Grand Haven Department of Public Safety
Greenville Department of Public Safety
Grosse Pointe Department of Public Safety
Grosse Pointe Farms Department of Public Safety
Grosse Pointe Park Department of Public Safety
Grosse Pointe Shores Department of Public Safety
Grosse Pointe Woods Department of Public Safety
Hampton Township Department of Public Safety
Harper Woods Department of Public Safety
Huntington Woods Department of Public Safety
Ionia Department of Public Safety
Ironwood Department of Public Safety
Kalamazoo Department of Public Safety (claims to be the largest, with about 380 sworn personnel)
Kingsford Department of Public Safety
Manistique Department of Public Safety
Monroe Department of Public Safety
Oak Park Department of Public Safety
Petoskey Department of Public Safety
Plainwell Department of Public Safety
Rockford Department of Public Safety
Springfield Department of Public Safety
St. Joseph Department of Public Safety
Minnesota 
Mankato Department of Public Safety
New Brighton Department of Public Safety
Woodbury Department of Public Safety
Missouri
Des Peres Department of Public Safety
Maryville Department of Public Safety
Sikeston Department of Public Safety
Mexico Public Safety Department
St. Louis Department of Public Safety
North Carolina
Asheville Regional Airport
Bald Head Island Public Safety
Butner Public Safety
Morganton Public Safety
New Hampshire
Waterville Valley Department of Public Safety
Oregon
Grants Pass Department of Public Safety
Ohio
Amberley Village Department of Public Safety
Oakwood Public Safety Department
South Carolina
Aiken Department of Public Safety
Cayce Department of Public Safety
Clinton Public Safety Department
North Augusta Department of Public Safety
Orangeburg Department of Public Safety
Spartanburg Public Safety Department
Union Public Safety Department
Winnsboro Department of Public Safety
Tennessee
Church Hill Department of Public Safety
Jonesborough Department of Public Safety
Kingston Springs Department of Public Safety
Lookout Mountain Police and Fire Department
Nashville International Airport Department of Public Safety
Norris Department of Public Safety
Waverly Department of Public Safety
Texas
Dalworthington Gardens Department of Public Safety
Fate Department of Public Safety
Health Department of Public Safety
Highland Park Department of Public Safety
Oak Point Department of Public Safety
Southlake Department of Public Safety
Woodway Public Safety Department
Wisconsin 
Ashwaubenon Department of Public Safety 
Palmyra Public Safety

Departments of public safety without cross-trained personnel
Alabama
Daleville Department of Public Safety

California
Norwalk Department of Public Safety

Colorado
Denver Department of Public Safety

New York
Co-op City Department of Public Safety
Hunts Point Department of Public Safety
Parkchester Department of Public Safety 
Westchester County Department of Public Safety
Cayuga Community College Department of Public Safety
Syracuse University Department of Public Safety
New York University Department of Public Safety
City University of New York Department of Public Safety

South Carolina
North Myrtle Beach Department of Public Safety (cross-trained until 2021)

Washington
Steilacoom Department of Public Safety

See also
 Coalition for Effective Public Safety
 Commissioner of Public Safety
 Commissioner of Public Affairs and Public Safety
 CUNY Public Safety Department (Peace Officers)
 Effective Safety Training
 Florida Public Safety Information Act
 Justice and Public Safety Practitioner
 Los Angeles County Office of Public Safety
 Interior ministry
 National Safety Council
 National Atmospheric Release Advisory Center
 Office of Public Safety
 Oregon Department of Public Safety Standards and Training
 Public-safety answering point
 Public Safety Officer Medal of Valor
 Wireless Communications and Public Safety Act
 Public Safety Employer-Employee Cooperation Act of 2007

References

Law enforcement in the United States
State agencies of the United States